Boris Alexandrovich Alexandrov (4 August 1905, Bologoye – 17 June 1994, Moscow) was a Soviet and Russian composer and, from 1946 to 1986, the second head of the Alexandrov Ensemble which was founded by his father, Alexander Vasilyevich Alexandrov. Alexandrov reached the rank of Major-General and was awarded the order of Hero of Socialist Labour, the Lenin and Stalin Prize, and named People's Artist of the USSR.

Life

Early years 
He began his musical career, aged 13, as a viola player and in the children's choir at the Bolshoi Theatre in Moscow, performing alongside singers such as Feodor Chaliapin. From 1923 to 1929 he attended the Moscow Conservatory, taught by Reinhold Glière. From 1929 to 1937 he ran the music department of the newly established Central Theatre of the Red Army and from 1933 to 1941 was associate professor of Moscow Conservatory. In 1937, he became the deputy artistic director of the Alexandrov Ensemble. He was also a composer, writing in various genres of symphonic and chamber instrumental music.

World War II 

During World War II, Boris Alexandrov, with his father, led the ensemble in All-Union radio concerts and over 1500 concerts at the Front, officially to actively promote Russian folk music and the songs of Soviet composers and folk music for the sake of patriotism and morale. During this time, Boris shouldered increasing responsibility, due to his father's heart condition. After Alexandrov's death in 1946, Boris Alexandrov, his son, went on to succeed his father as musical director for the ensemble.

Leadership of the Ensemble 
Boris Alexandrov was a composer, arranger, conductor, music critic, artist and teacher: an important 20th century figure in Russian military music. He saw to the training and promotion of many fine soloists. After World War II, the ensemble, led by Boris Alexandrov, traveled abroad sixty-eight times and was well received in many countries throughout Europe. He carried on the central idea which drove his father: that the choir was central to the ensemble, and that without the choir there would be no ensemble.

Close of a long career 
In 1985, his 80th birthday was publicly celebrated. Alexandrov finally retired in 1987. He was succeeded by Igor Agafonnikov the same year, with Anatoly Maltsev as the ensemble chief. He retired as the principal conductor in 1994; he died that year and was buried in Moscow at the Novodevichy Cemetery. He was succeeded by Viktor Fedorov, the chorus master since 1986.

Collaborations 

The ensemble under Boris Alexandrov worked with People's Artist of the RSFSR, laureate of Stalin Prize KP Vinogradov; People's Artist of the USSR Y. Petrov the Principal Chorus Master; VG Sokolov (later People's Artist of the USSR and Professor of the Moscow Conservatory); BI Kulikov (later Rector of the Moscow Conservatory); ES Tytyanko (People's Artist of the USSR); and VV Samsonenko, AP Kulygin and VI Chusei, all Honored Artists of the RSFSR. Dancers worked with People's Artist of the USSR PP Virsky, soloists of the Bolshoi Theatre, Honored Art Worker AI Radunsky and Honored Artist of the RSFSR KG Farmanyants and People's Artist of the USSR U.P. Khmelnitski. The orchestra worked with VA Aleksandrov, VV Samsonenko both Honored Artist of the RSFSR, and People's Artist of the RSFSR VA Korobko.

Compositions and arrangements 
He added over 150 new works to the repertoire, including works of composers local to the countries visited by the ensemble. He worked with living Soviet composers, enriching both works and performance. He wrote symphonic, chamber, instrumental, vocal-symphonic and theatrical music, and specialized in military music. He wrote a national anthem for which he received an award from the Ministry of Culture of the Soviet Union, and for which he was known by contemporaries as "the soldier-patriot". In 1937 he wrote the operetta Wedding in Malinovka which contained patriotic themes: revolutionaries, soldiers, peasants and folk music. Other operettas include The Girl from Barcelona (1942) about Russian partisans and a female Spanish co-combatant; My Gyuzel (1946), Near You (1949) and The One Hundred and First Wife (1957). Ballets include Young Friendship and Southpaw (1955). He also wrote cantatas including Cantata of the Party (1955), the oratorio October Soldier Defending the World (1967), Book of the Motherland (1979), plus the suite Guarding (1981).

Alexandrov composed the song "Long Live Our State" (Да здравствует наша держава) to be the anthem of the Soviet Union. It was rejected however, but the 1943 composition (with different lyrics) became the national anthem of Transnistria in the 1990s. The song was used in parades in the Soviet Union and continues to be used at the end of Victory Day parades in Moscow today, adapted as a military march. Another march composed by him is "March of Joint Armies".

Awards 
 Medal "For Distinguished Labour" (1939)
 Honored Artist of the RSFSR (1944)
 People's Artist of the RSFSR (1948)
 Three Orders of Lenin (1949, 1967, 1975)
 Stalin Prize, 1st class (1950)
 Medal "For Battle Merit" (1953)
 People's Artist of the USSR (1958)
 Order of the Red Banner of Labour (1964)
 Hero of Socialist Labour (1975)
 Lenin Prize (1978)
 Order "For Service to the Homeland in the Armed Forces of the USSR", 3rd class (1982)
 Glinka State Prize of the RSFSR (1985)
 Order of the October Revolution (1985)
 Order of the Patriotic War, 2nd class (1985)

See also
Alexandrov Ensemble
Alexandrov Ensemble choir
Alexandrov Ensemble soloists
Alexandrov Ensemble discography
Alexander Vasilyevich Alexandrov

References

External link

1905 births
1994 deaths
20th-century classical musicians
20th-century composers
20th-century Russian conductors (music)
20th-century Russian male musicians
People from Valdaysky Uyezd
Communist Party of the Soviet Union members
Academic staff of Moscow Conservatory
Moscow Conservatory alumni
Heroes of Socialist Labour
Honored Artists of the RSFSR
People's Artists of the RSFSR
People's Artists of the USSR
Stalin Prize winners
Lenin Prize winners
Glinka State Prize of the RSFSR winners
Recipients of the Order "For Service to the Homeland in the Armed Forces of the USSR", 3rd class
Recipients of the Order of Lenin
Recipients of the Order of the Red Banner of Labour
Military music composers
Russian conductors (music)
Russian film score composers
Russian major generals
Russian male composers
Russian music educators
Soviet conductors (music)
Soviet film score composers
Soviet major generals
Soviet male composers
Soviet music educators
Burials at Novodevichy Cemetery